Jan Andrzej Kotlarczyk (22 November 1903 – 18 July 1966) was a Polish footballer. He played in twenty matches for the Poland national football team from 1928 to 1935.

References

External links
 

1903 births
1966 deaths
Polish footballers
Poland international footballers
Association football midfielders
Wisła Kraków players
Footballers from Kraków
Burials at Rakowicki Cemetery